A stepfather or stepdad is a non-biological male parent married to one's preexisting parent.

A stepfather-in-law is a stepfather of one's spouse. Children from his spouse's previous unions are known as his stepchildren.

Culture
Though less common in literature than stereotypical evil stepmothers, there are also cases of evil stepfathers. 
In French, the term (Parâtre) refers to a wicked stepfather.
They are generally portrayed as contemptuous, sometimes violent with their adopted children, such as in the fairy tales Eleonore, by R.J.P Toreille, published in France in 2018, who portrays the cruel and evil stepfather who abuses and traumatizes his stepdaughter in the heroine's own home. Or in The Gold-Bearded Man (in a plot usually featuring a cruel father) and The Little Bull-Calf. One type of such tale features a defeated villain who insists on marrying the hero's mother and makes her help him trick the hero and so defeat him. Such tales include The Prince and the Princess in the Forest and The Blue Belt, although the tales of this type can also feature a different female relation, such as the stepsister in The Three Princes and their Beasts.

In fiction, evil stepfathers include Claudius in Hamlet (though his role as uncle is more emphasized), Walter Parks Thatcher in Citizen Kane (though this is debatable), Murdstone in Charles Dickens's David Copperfield, the King from the movie Radio Flyer, and Gozaburo Kaiba (who adopted Seto and Mokuba Kaiba) from Yu-Gi-Oh!. The Stepfather  also depict an evil father who has murdered his family and subsequent families. The film Sucker Punch features a sexually abusive stepfather.

In his opera La Cenerentola, Gioacchino Rossini inverted the tale of Cinderella to have her oppressed by her stepfather. His motive is made explicit, in that providing a dowry to Cenerentola would cut into what he can give to his own daughters. An analogous male figure may also appear as a wicked uncle; like the stepmother, the father's brother may covet the child's inheritance for his own children, and so maltreat his nephews or nieces. Modern films, however, seem to cast stepfathers in a somewhat kinder light, implying honorable men who marry divorced women or single mothers make good stepfathers.

References

Stepfamily
Parenting
Terms for men